Lasse Erik Pöysti (24 January 1927 – 5 April 2019) was a Finnish actor,  director, theatre manager and writer. He was born in Sortavala.

Biography 
Pöysti began his career as a child actor, becoming known to the Finnish public as Olli Suominen in the "Suominen family" films. The first of these films as Suomisen perhe (1941). Pöysti was 14 years old at the time of the film. Pöysti matriculated in 1945 in the Helsinki Normal Lyceum.

From 1967 to 1974, Pöysti served as manager of the Lilla Teatern, with ex-wife Birgitta Ulfsson, and also acted in many roles in Swedish. During 1974–1981 he was the manager of the Tampere Workers' Theatre, and during 1981–1985 the manager of the Royal Dramatic Theatre in Stockholm. In his later career he has had many speaking roles in musical plays. He also had many roles on television, including the leading roles in the Strindberg plays Gustav III and Erik XIV. Another performance was the title role in the stage play Galileo by Bertold Brecht, which won critical acclaim. He also read bedtime stories in children's programs.

In addition to his stage career, Pöysti wrote several books, including his own memoirs. In 2002, Pöysti chose the book Juoksuhaudantie by Kari Hotakainen as the winner of the Finlandia Prize. Pöysti once lived in Paris, but later lived in Lauttasaari, Helsinki. His son Tom Pöysti has also acted in many film and theatre roles. In 2010, Pöysti received the Concrete-Jussi for lifetime achievement (the Jussi Awards are the equivalent to the Oscars in Finland).

He was married to actress Birgitta Ulfsson from 1952 to 1984. Their son Erik Pöysti and granddaughter Alma Pöysti are both actors in Helsinki.

Selected filmography

1941: Suomisen perhe - Olli Suominen
1941: Täysosuma - Skier (uncredited)
1941: Onnellinen ministeri - Errand Boy (uncredited)
1942: Suomisen Ollin tempaus - Olli Suominen
1943: Suomisen taiteilijat - Olli Suominen
1944: Suomisen Olli rakastuu - Olli Suominen
1945: Suomisen Olli yllättää - Olli Suominen
1948: Haaviston Leeni - (uncredited)
1948: Kilroy sen teki - Pete
1948: Hormoonit valloillaan - Pena
1949: Ruma Elsa - Usko Aamunen
1949: Katupeilin takana - Arvid
1949: Sinut minä tahdon - Seppo Vesa
1949: Professori Masa - Pentti Simola
1950: Isäpappa ja keltanokka - Aimo Tammela
1950: Rakkaus on nopeampi Piiroisen pässiäkin - Heikki Piiparinen
1951: Vain laulajapoikia - Dr. Syrjä
1951: Radio tekee murron - Radio reporter
1951: The General's Fiancée - Korpraali Jukka Oksapää
1951: A Night in Rio - Lasse
1951: Tukkijoella - Pölhö-Kustaa
1951: Vihaan sinua - rakas - Tauno Karnala
1952: Kaikkien naisten monni - Alokas Nieminen
1953: Two Funny Guys - Säveltäjä Jussi Mäki
1953: The Millionaire Recruit - Vihuri
1954: Kovanaama - Reporter Esko Pekuri
1954: Laivaston monnit maissa - Maisteri Segerstråhle
1954: Putkinotko - Malakias
1955: Näkemiin Helena - Lennu
1955: Sankarialokas - Alokas Esko Sirola / legioonal. T. Smith / matr T. MacDonald
1955: Miss Eurooppaa metsästämässä - Antero W. Lintunen
1955: Villi Pohjola - Kapakkapianisti
1957: Vääpelin kauhu - Jaska
1957: Syntipukki - Frans Koikkalainen
1958: Asessorin naishuolet - Veikko Pajukivi
1958: Sotapojan heilat - Alokas Esko Puustinen
1959: Taas tapaamme Suomisen perheen - Olli Suominen
1960: Justus järjestää kaiken - Justus
1964: Bröllopsbesvär - Peddler
1966: Syskonbädd 1782 - Guest at the tavern
1968: Punahilkka - Matti - airline pilot
1969:  Mumintrollet (TV Series) - Mumintrollet
1976: Pyhä perhe - Paavo Mäkinen
1977: Pikku Kakkonen (TV Series) - Himself - the host
1978: The Adventures of Picasso - Sirkka's Father (uncredited)
1979: Linus eller Tegelhusets hemlighet - Antique Dealer
1979: Herr Puntila and His Servant Matti - Johannes Puntila
1980: Barna från Blåsjöfjället - Lasso-Lassi
1980: Det blir jul på Möllegården (TV Series) - Pixie
1982: Flight of the Eagle - Photographer
1984: The Clan – Tale of the Frogs - Siilipää
1984: Dirty Story - Private detective
1986: Flucht in den Norden
1986: Kuningas lähtee Ranskaan - The Stablemaster
1986: På liv och död - Sångare i tunnelbanan
1986: Näkemiin, hyvästi - Lauri Valve, Tuulan isä
1987: Lain ulkopuolella - Chairman of the Court
1988: The Glory and Misery of Human Life - Martti Hongisto
1989: Dårfinkar och dönickar (TV Mini-Series) - Morfar
1989: Tjurens år (TV Movie) - Onkel Jegor
1992: Mestari - Kalevi Suomalainen
1993: Macklean (TV Series) - Carl August Ehrensvärd
1993: Rosenbaum (TV Series) - Erik 'Lunkan' Lundkvist
1995: Vita lögner - Lindqvist
1995: Petri tårar - The Cripple
1999: Lapin kullan kimallus - Konrad Planting
2008: Thomas - Thomas

References

External links

1927 births
2019 deaths
People from Sortavala
Finnish people of German descent
Finnish male actors
Finnish writers
Finnish dramatists and playwrights
Finnish military personnel of World War II
Finnish expatriates in France